Flavius Claudius can refer to:

Julian (emperor) (Flavius Claudius Julianus) (331–363), Roman emperor from 361 to 363
Constantine II (emperor) (Flavius Claudius Constantinus) (316–340), Roman emperor from 337 to 340.
Constantine III (western emperor) (Flavius Claudius Constantinus), Roman emperor from 407 to 411